Richard White (born 1953) is an American actor and opera singer best known for voicing the character of Gaston in Disney's Beauty and the Beast. He also voiced the character in the early 2000s animated TV series House of Mouse.

Career
White also played the character of Gaylord Ravenal in Show Boat at Paper Mill Playhouse and Robert Mission in The New Moon, at the New York City Opera. White also created the title role of Erik in the world premiere of Arthur Kopit and Maury Yeston's musical, Phantom and sings the role on the cast recording. White has performed on Broadway as Joey in The Most Happy Fella and has had roles in New York revivals of Brigadoon, South Pacific, and Auntie Mame. He was nominated for a 1985 Joseph Jefferson Award for Actor in a Principal Role in a Musical for "Carousel" at the Marriott Theatre in Chicago, Illinois. From 2012 to 2013, White starred as Sir Danvers Carew in the national tour and Broadway revival of Jekyll & Hyde.

Filmography

Actor

Theatre work

Broadway
 1979 – The Most Happy Fella – Neighbor
 2013 – Jekyll and Hyde – Sir Danvers Carew
 2015 – Gigi

Off-Broadway
 1980 – Elizabeth and Essex – Performer
 1987 – The Desert Song – Pierre Birabeau/The Red Shadow

Regional
 1984 – The Desert Song – Pierre Birabeau/The Red Shadow
 1985 – Show Boat – Performer
 1985 – Carousel – Performer
 1987 – Annie Get Your Gun – Performer
 1989 – Show Boat – Gaylord Ravenal
 1991 – Phantom – Erik/The Phantom
 1991 – The Merry Widow – Performer
 1992 – Oklahoma! – Performer
 1993 – Phantom – Erik/The Phantom
 1994 – Camelot – Lancelot
 1996 – Gigi – Performer
 1998 – Dr. Jekyll and Mr. Hyde – Dr. Jekyll
 2004 – Chasing Nicolette – Count de Valence
 2013 – A Christmas Carol – Ebenezer Scrooge

Soundtrack

References

External links
 
 
 The San Diego Drama King - An Interview with Richard White

1953 births
Living people
American male voice actors
American operatic baritones